German submarine U-659 was a Type VIIC U-boat built for Nazi Germany's Kriegsmarine for service during World War II.
She was laid down on 12 February 1941 by Howaldtswerke, Hamburg as yard number 808, launched on 14 October 1941 and commissioned on 9 December 1941 under Oberleutnant zur See Hans Stock.

Design
German Type VIIC submarines were preceded by the shorter Type VIIB submarines. U-659 had a displacement of  when at the surface and  while submerged. She had two shafts and two  propellers.

U-659 was fitted with five  torpedo tubes (four fitted at the bow and one at the stern), fourteen torpedoes, one  SK C/35 naval gun, 220 rounds, and a  C/30 anti-aircraft gun. The boat had a complement of between forty-four and sixty.

Service history
The boat's career began with training at 5th U-boat Flotilla on 9 December 1941, followed by active service on 1 September 1942 as part of the 9th Flotilla for the remainder of her service.

Wolfpacks
U-659 took part in seven wolfpacks, namely:
 Vorwärts (25 August – 11 September 1942)
 Streitaxt (20 – 31 October 1942)
 Spitz (22 – 29 December 1942)
 Neptun (18 February – 3 March 1943)
 Westmark (6 – 8 March 1943)
 Neuland (8 – 13 March 1943)
 Drossel (29 April – 4 May 1943)

Fate
There were just 3 survivors, and 44 hands lost.

Summary of raiding history

References

Bibliography

External links

German Type VIIC submarines
1941 ships
U-boats commissioned in 1941
U-boats sunk in 1943
U-boats sunk by German warships
World War II shipwrecks in the Atlantic Ocean
World War II submarines of Germany
Ships built in Hamburg
Maritime incidents in May 1943